S Timothy G Adewole is an Anglican bishop in Nigeria. He is Bishop of Kwara having previously been Bishop of Jebba, both in the  Anglican Province of Kwara, itself one of 14 within the Church of Nigeria.

Notes

Living people
21st-century Anglican bishops in Nigeria
21st-century Anglican archbishops
Anglican bishops of Jebba
Year of birth missing (living people)
Anglican bishops of Kwara